The Villa Costebelle is a historic mansion in Barcelonnette, Alpes-de-Haute-Provence, Provence-Alpes-Côte d'Azur, France. It was built from 1913 to 1914 for Victor Garcin, a French businessman in Mexico. It has been listed as an official historical monument since 1986.

References

Houses completed in 1914
Monuments historiques of Provence-Alpes-Côte d'Azur
20th-century architecture in France